John Taylor Gilman (December 19, 1753September 1, 1828) was a farmer, shipbuilder and statesman from Exeter, New Hampshire. He represented New Hampshire in the Continental Congress in 1782–1783 and was the fifth governor of New Hampshire for 14 years, from 1794 to 1805, and from 1813 to 1816.

Early life
Gilman was born in Exeter, in the Province of New Hampshire, the son of Ann (Taylor) and Nicholas Gilman. His brother was Nicholas Gilman, who had signed the U.S. Constitution. His family had settled in Exeter in its earliest days. He lived in the Ladd-Gilman House, now a part of the American Independence Museum. He received a limited education before he entered into the family shipbuilding and mercantile businesses. Aged 22, he read aloud a Dunlap Broadside brought to New Hampshire on July 16, 1776 to the city of Exeter. The American Independence Museum commemorates his brave act every year at their American Independence Festival, where a role-player reads the Declaration in its entirety to festival-goers.

Career
 Gilman was one of the Minutemen of 1775 and a selectman in 1777 and 1778. Gilman served as a member of the New Hampshire House of Representatives in 1779 and 1781 and was a delegate to the Convention of the States in Hartford, Connecticut, in October 1780. He served as a member of the Continental Congress in 1782 and 1783. He was the New Hampshire Treasurer in 1791 and moderator in 1791–1794, 1806, 1807, 1809–1811, 1817, 1818, and 1820–1825.

Gilman served as Governor of New Hampshire between 1794 and 1805 and was an unsuccessful candidate for re-election in 1805. He was again a member of the New Hampshire House of Representatives in 1810 and 1811 and again an unsuccessful candidate for governor in 1812. He was elected governor and served from 1813 to 1816 and declined to be a candidate for renomination for governor in 1816. He was an ex officio trustee of Dartmouth College, Hanover, New Hampshire (1794–1805 and 1813–1816), and trustee by election (1817–1819). He was president of the board of trustees of Phillips Exeter Academy, Exeter, New Hampshire, 1795–1827, and donor of the oldest property, the 'Yard,' upon which the older buildings stand. Gilman was also elected a member of the American Antiquarian Society in 1814.

Personal life
Gilman was married to Deborah (Folsom) Gilman, the daughter of Major General Nathaniel Folsom of Exeter. He died in Exeter on September 1, 1828. He is the first governor of New Hampshire not to have a place in the state named after him. The town of Gilmanton, settled by 24 members of the extended Gilman clan, was named for the family as a whole and not for the Governor.

See also
New Hampshire Historical Marker No. 161: Ladd-Gilman House

References

External links

Gilman's Congressional Biography
Gilman, John Taylor, 1753–1828, Guide to Research Collections

1753 births
1828 deaths
Gilman family of New Hampshire
American people of Welsh descent
Continental Congressmen from New Hampshire
18th-century American politicians
New Hampshire militiamen in the American Revolution
Governors of New Hampshire
People from Exeter, New Hampshire
Phillips Exeter Academy
New Hampshire Federalists
Federalist Party state governors of the United States
Members of the American Antiquarian Society